An All-American team is an honorary sports team composed of the best amateur players of a specific season for each team position—who in turn are given the honorific "All-America" and typically referred to as "All-American athletes", or simply "All-Americans".  Although the honorees generally do not compete together as a unit, the term is used in U.S. team sports to refer to players who are selected by members of the national media.  Walter Camp selected the first All-America team in the early days of American football in 1889.  The 2014 NCAA Men's Basketball All-Americans are honorary lists that include All-American selections from the Associated Press (AP), the United States Basketball Writers Association (USBWA), the Sporting News (TSN), and the National Association of Basketball Coaches (NABC) for the 2013–14 NCAA Division I men's basketball season.  All selectors choose at least a first and second 5-man team. The NABC, TSN and AP choose third teams, while AP also lists honorable mention selections.

The Consensus 2014 College Basketball All-American team is determined by aggregating the results of the four major All-American teams as determined by the National Collegiate Athletic Association (NCAA).  Since United Press International was replaced by TSN in 1997, the four major selectors have been the aforementioned ones.  AP has been a selector since 1948, NABC since 1957 and USBWA since 1960.  To earn "consensus" status, a player must win honors based on a point system computed from the four different all-America teams. The point system consists of three points for first team, two points for second team and one point for third team. No honorable mention or fourth team or lower are used in the computation.  The top five totals plus ties are first team and the next five plus ties are second team.

Although the aforementioned lists are used to determine consensus honors, there are numerous other All-American lists.  The ten finalists for the John Wooden Award are described as Wooden All-Americans. The ten finalists for the Senior CLASS Award are described as Senior All-Americans.  Other All-American lists include those determined by Fox Sports, and Yahoo! Sports.  The scholar-athletes selected by College Sports Information Directors of America (CoSIDA) are termed Academic All-Americans.

2014 Consensus All-America team
PG – Point guard
SG – Shooting guard
PF – Power forward
SF – Small forward
C – Center

Individual All-America teams

By team

AP Honorable Mention:

 Karvel Anderson, Robert Morris
 Cameron Ayers, Bucknell
 Cameron Bairstow, New Mexico
 Billy Baron, Canisius
 Jerrelle Benimon, Towson
 Davion Berry, Weber State
 Taylor Braun, North Dakota State
 De'Mon Brooks, Davidson
 John Brown, High Point
 Bryce Cotton, Providence
 Joel Embiid, Kansas
 Tyler Ennis, Syracuse
 Aaron Gordon, Arizona
 Langston Hall, Mercer
 Gary Harris, Michigan State
 Tyler Haws, BYU
 R. J. Hunter, Georgia State
 Jordair Jett, Saint Louis
 Shawn Jones, Middle Tennessee
 DeAndre Kane, Iowa State
 J. J. Mann, Belmont
 Javon McCrea, Buffalo
 Daniel Mullings, New Mexico State
 Aaric Murray, Texas Southern
 Marcus Paige, North Carolina
 Jacob Parker, Stephen F. Austin
 Lamar Patterson, Pittsburgh
 Adreian Payne, Michigan State
 Casey Prather, Florida
 Wesley Saunders, Harvard
 Marcus Smart, Oklahoma State
 Juwan Staten, West Virginia
 Keifer Sykes, Green Bay
 Xavier Thames, San Diego State
 Fred VanVleet, Wichita State
 Jameel Warney, Stony Brook
 Alan Williams, UC Santa Barbara
 Pendarvis Williams, Norfolk State
 Patric Young, Florida

Academic All-Americans
On February 20, 2014, CoSIDA and Capital One announced the 2014 Academic All-America team, with Aaron Craft headlining the University Division as the men's college basketball Academic All-American of the Year.  The following is the 2013–14 Capital One Academic All-America Men's Basketball Team (University Division) as selected by CoSIDA:

Senior All-Americans
The ten finalists for the Senior CLASS Award are called Senior All-Americans.  The 10 honorees are as follows:

References

All-Americans
NCAA Men's Basketball All-Americans